A Rubovian Legend  (1955) is a British children's television series created by Gordon Murray.

Background
It began as a black and white children's puppet play for the BBC in the mid-1950s, presented by The BBC Puppet Theatre. The first Rubovia play was transmitted live in December 1955 and was entitled 'The Queen's Dragon' and was performed by string marionettes.

Puppeteers Bob Bura and John Hardwick, and designers Andrew and Margaret Brownfoot, worked with Murray to produce 26 further episodes between about 1955 and 1960. Rubovia was made in a very different style to the series for which Murray would later be known, involving large, string-operated puppets with caricatured features.

Cast
Among those lending their vocal talents to the series were Roy Skelton, Derek Nimmo and Philip Latham. The music was provided by Freddie Phillips.

Episodes
The episodes were repeated throughout the early 1960s. In 1976, six of the plays were remade in colour, with redesigned puppets and settings, as a stop motion animated series called Rubovia. These remakes introduced some new characters.

Background to the Kingdom of Rubovia
Rubovia is presented as a kingdom in an undisclosed location, but almost certainly in Central Europe. It is known to share borders with the (equally fictional) Kingdom of Borsovia and the Grand Duchy of Humperstein.

The land is ruled as a benevolent monarchy by King Rufus XIV, descendant of a long line of kings, all apparently named Rufus (although the heir apparent bears the title of Prince Rupert), and his Queen Caroline.

The population – at least the Royal Household – speak the English language and wear clothes that imitate the European fashions of approximately the late 18th century. They also lack the modern technology that other parts of Europe have adopted. This may be explained by the fact that, for unknown reasons, the Industrial Revolution bypassed Rubovia. The technology of the country operates on a level of steam engines. Electricity and telecommunication devices such as the telephone have never been adopted by the kingdom, and much use is made of clockwork.

Rubovia is one place, perhaps the only place, in Europe, where magic still works, although not always successfully. The main practitioner of the often ill-fated attempts at magic is Albert Wetherspoon (also spelled Weatherspoon). Weatherspoon is based in the Royal Household and carries out a wide variety of important duties, including Master of the Rolls, Court Photographer and Royal Gardener. As Court Musician, he plays the Royal organ with his cat Puss (or puss) pressing the air pump with its tail.

Whilst Rufus tends to be a somewhat amiable and bumbling character, delegating most duties to Weatherspoon and the Lord Chamberlain, and consorting with his friend King Boris of Borsovia, his wife Caroline is a more formidable character. A close friend and cousin of Grand Duchess Arabella of Humperstein, she is much taken up with her pampered pet dragon Pongo, who has a habit of turning into a cabbage whenever he hiccups.

Another frequent character was McGregor, an Indian with a Chinese accent who would appear usually causing trouble.

Little is known of the general populace of Rubovia, except that they are mostly employed in agricultural activities. Consequently, the main (perhaps only) export of Rubovia is quality vegetables. The cabbages from the Royal Cabbage Patch are especially prized.

See also

Trumptonshire
 Grand Fenwick

References

External links
http://www.roxburgh.org/rubovia Realm of Rubovia
 

BBC children's television shows
Fictional European countries
1955 British television series debuts
1960 British television series endings
1976 British television series debuts
1976 British television series endings
British television shows featuring puppetry
1950s British children's television series
1960s British children's television series
1970s British children's television series
British stop-motion animated television series
Television shows set in Europe
Television series set in fictional countries
Steampunk television series
Television series about royalty
Television series about dragons